An African Night's Entertainment is a 1962 folktale novel by Nigerian author Cyprian Ekwensi.

Plot 
The novel is set in Northern Nigeria and is narrated by old story teller. it tells the story of Abu Bakir and his quest for vengeance after Mallam Shehu, a wealthy merchant who is in need of a child marries Zainobe, the girl bethroned to him and the love of his life.

Despite Abu losing an eye and ear and roaming different towns in order to make Kyauta the child of Mallam Shehu and Zainobe worthless, he achieves his goal to make Kyauta a thug and kill his father. Later, Abu is killed by Kyauta who is now free of the spell cast on him earlier in the story by Abu.

Themes 
Major themes in the novel include desire, vengeance and child marriage.

Controversy 
The novel was the subject of different controversy when its author Cyprian Ekwensi was accused of plagiarising Jikin Magayi a 1934 novel by Rupert East and Tafida Zaria written in Hausa but he defended it calling it his own retelling of a folktale once told to him by an old Hausa mallam.

References 

1962 Nigerian novels
Nigerian fantasy novels
1962 fantasy novels
Folklore
Novels set in Nigeria
Novels by Cyprian Ekwensi